Fakhreddin Shadman, also known as Fakhreddin Shadman Valari, (1907–1967) was one of the leading scholars, writers and statesmen in the Pahlavi Iran. He was a faculty member at the University of Tehran. He also held various cabinet posts in 1948 and in 1953–1954.

Early life and education
Shadman was born in Tehran in 1907 into a family composed of clerics. His father, His father, Hājj Sayyed Abu Torab, was a cleric. He was the eldest child of his parents and had five brothers and one sister.

Shadman completed his secondary education at the Darolfonun school in Tehran. He attended the Teachers Training College where he graduated in 1925 and had a degree from the School of Law in Tehran in 1927. He received a PhD in history from the London School of Economics and Political Science in 1943. Charles Kingsley Webster was his advisor, and his thesis was entitled The Relations of Britain and Persia, 1800-15.

Career
Following his graduation Shadman joined the Iranian judiciary system and served as the deputy public prosecutor of Tehran. Between 1932 and 1935 he worked at the Anglo-Persian Oil Company. During his studies at the London School of Economics and Political Science he also taught Persian there and also, at the School of Oriental and African Studies. During World War II he left Britain for the United States where he worked as a visiting scholar at Harvard University.

He returned to Iran and began to work at various state institutions. On 15 June 1948 he was appointed minister of national economy to the cabinet led by Prime Minister Abdolhossein Hazhir. In 1950 he joined the University of Tehran where he became a professor of the history of Iran and Islam. Shadman was appointed minister of economy in 1953 and then minister of justice in 1954 to the cabinet headed by Fazlollah Zahedi. He continued to serve as minister of national economy in the next cabinet formed by Hossein Ala' in the spring of 1955 when Zahedi resigned from office. Retiring from politics Shadman taught at the University of Tehran until 1967. He was also the administrator of Imam Reza Shrine Properties, a member of the Iranian Academy and the Cultural Council of the Imperial Court of Iran and a board member of Pahlavi Library.

Shadman was one of the individuals who contributed to the establishment of the Oil College in Abadan, known as Petroleum University of Technology.

Views
Shadman was a nationalist and one of the early Iranian scholars who emphasized the negative effects of the modernization on the Iranian society. He adopted Martin Heidegger's notion that in each historical period there is a truth "which obscures competing truths." Based on this he argued that the Western-origin views should be avoided to maintain the spiritual origins and political unity of Iran. His views are regarded as the basis for the nationalistic approach of the Islamic left figures.

Personal life and death
Shadman married Farangis Namazi in London in 1941. In 1967 he was diagnosed with cancer and went to London for treatment. He died there on 26 August 1967 and was buried in Mashhad near the shrine of Imam Reza shrine.

References

1907 births
1967 deaths
Government ministers of Iran
People of Pahlavi Iran
Politicians from Tehran
Academic staff of the University of Tehran
Deaths from cancer in the United Kingdom
Alumni of the London School of Economics
Ministers of Justice of Iran
20th-century Iranian historians
Historians of Islam
Historians of Iran
Heidegger scholars
Iranian nationalists